Attarintlo Akka Chellellu was an Indian Telugu-language soap opera that aired on Zee Telugu. It starred Chaitra Rai in a dual role with Madhubabu and Akarsh. On 2021, Chaitra Rai's Dharani and Sravani roles was replaced by Bhoomi Shetty and Navya Rao respectively. The series premiered on 25 March 2019 and was remade in Tamil as Rettai Roja on Zee Tamil. The series was concluded on 29 May 2021.

Plot
It revolving around twin sisters Sravani and Dharani. Sravani hates Dharani and dreams to be the queen of her world, while Dharani strives to protect her family from evil.

Sravani and Dharani, twin sisters hail from a lower middle-class family, where their father works several odd jobs to give them a better life. Sravani is a self-centred and ambitious girl who has no worries. While Dharani is considerate in nature as she recognizes the challenges and sacrifices made by their father to educate and raise them. Dharani forfeits her education and other comforts for Sravani to pursue her higher studies and lead a comfortable life, in order to lessen the burden of their father. Sravani grows up to achieve all her dreams and become a lawyer.

Cast

Main
 Chaitra Rai (2019–2020) in a dual role as Sravani and Dharani (Twin sisters)
 Bhoomi Shetty replaced Chaitra Rai in the role of Dharani (2021–present)
 Navya Rao replaced Chaitra Rai in the role of Sravani as face transplantation.
 Madhubabu in a dual role as Vikram and Surya Pratap Varma 
 Akarsh byramudi as Aditya aka Nani

Recurring
 Anu Manasa
 Sri Satya

Remake
Now this series concept is in the Tamil-language as Rettai Roja, which airing on Zee Tamil. But the circumstances of death by Sravani in Zee Telugu's "Akka Chellellu" and by Anuradha in "Rettai Roja" were different. In "Akka Chellellu" Sravani meets her end in a car accident, wherein her car flies off a cliff (but actually not dead. She came after face transplantation) while in Zee Tamil's "Rettai Roja" Anuradha got murdered by Sreeja and Chinthamani. Sreeja stabbed Anuradha with knife.

References

External links
 Akka Chellelu on ZEE5

Telugu-language television shows
Indian television soap operas
2019 Indian television series debuts
Zee Telugu original programming
Indian drama television series
2021 Indian television series endings